2019 was a common year. It may also refer to:
2019 (number), a number that can be represented with a sum of 3 prime numbers
2019, After the Fall of New York, a 1983 Italian flim
2019 (EP), by Lucy Dacus, 2019
2019, an album by Inoran

See also
Coronavirus disease 2019 (COVID-19), a disease caused by SARS-CoV-2